The Peekskill Valley Railroad was a  long narrow gauge railroad in Peekskill, New York. It was inaugurated in 1873.

History 

The Peekskill Valley Railroad was built by the Peekskill Iron Company in 1873, from their furnaces, at Peekskill, Westchester county, to a point on the Hudson River Railroad, over a distance of seven miles.

According to other sources, high grade iron ore from the Croft or Indian Lake Mines was extracted and transported by narrow gauge railway down Canopus Valley to the Peekskill Blast Furnace of the Empire State Iron Works at Annsville Creek from 1878 to 1887. The mine was abandoned in 1887 and the tracks removed for salvage in 1910.

The superstructure and equipment was very light. The weight of the locomotive was four tons.

See also 
 Peekskill Lighting and Railroad Company

Weblinks 
 Route superimposed onto OpenStreetMap

References 

Railway companies established in 1873
Railway companies disestablished in 1910
Defunct railroads
2 ft gauge railways in the United States